The Irish Blue Cross is an animal welfare charity formed in Ireland in 1945 by incorporating the welfare charity "Our Dumb Friends' League" into a new small animal and equine welfare organisation. The charity provides low-cost veterinary services to people on a low income in the greater Dublin area.

Registered charity
The Irish Blue Cross is a registered charity (CHY 5386).

Mobile veterinary clinics and partnerships
The Irish Blue Cross put its first Mobile Van veterinary clinic onto the streets of Dublin in 1953. The mobile service was founded by Niall Murphy MRCVS. He was a very compassionate and well respected veterinary surgeon who worked in small animal practice and went on to establish the first veterinary hospital in Dublin, at that time in 28 Dartmouth Road, Dun Laoghaire, County Dublin. He studied and at times taught Veterinary Sciences in Trinity College Dublin.

Since its foundation, the Blue Cross charity has continued to develop the service whilst extending its support for needy pets through its small-animal clinic in Inchicore and its partnership with private veterinary practices. Since 1945, it has provided care to over 600,000 pets.

Ten Blue Cross mobile veterinary clinics are in operation weekly now throughout Dublin and are manned by a dedicated volunteer force of vets, drivers and helpers.

Services
The Irish Blue Cross provides low-cost veterinary services to pet owners on a low income in the greater Dublin area. In 2012, the charity carried out over 27,000 treatments, vaccinations, check-ups, x-rays, neutering and other operations to pets. These procedures were carried out at the charity's Dublin-based mobile clinics and at its small-animal clinic in Inchicore.

Support and grants
The Irish Blue Cross relies on donations from the general public to cover the costs of carrying out its work. It has many fundraising events throughout the year, such as its Easter Raffle, World Animal Week pens campaign, and its ever-popular Bark in the Park™ sponsored dog walks during the Summer. The Bark in the Park™ events involve a 4 km walk through some of Dublin's finest parks, a raffle, music, goody bags and prizes for the dog with the Best Bark, Shiniest Coat, Happiest Smile and Waggiest Tail.

The charity also receives some funding from the Department of Rural and Community Development and the Department of Agriculture, Food and the Marine. Each year, Dublin City Council and other local authorities also give significant grant aid to the charity.

Horse ambulance services
The Irish Blue Cross also operates a horse ambulance service that attends at all Irish racecourses, north and south. In an average year, the frontline fleet of three ambulance units provides about 400 days of service. Experienced staff work closely with racecourse veterinary surgeons to assist racehorses ‘pulled up’ or injured during the course of racing. This service is not paid for from the charity donations provided to the small animal section of The Irish Blue Cross, rather it is separately funded by Horse Racing Ireland and other racing organizations and equine welfare specific donations from some users, horse racing and associated industries. The Irish Blue Cross horse ambulances are also to be seen at the RDS Annual Horse Show, International Horse Trials in Ireland, and some Point-to-Points.

The Irish Blue Cross branded horse ambulance units are a regular sight on Irish roads travelling to and from race meetings; have a standing commitment allowing them to provide three fully equipped units at events on any one day, and in exceptional circumstances, utilizing reserve equipment, they can provide up to five units on a single day if necessary.

In recent years the horse ambulance fleet have also provided services to the Irish film industry (when scenes involving large numbers of horses or specific stunts are being filmed). Occasionally (and unfortunately) Irish Blue Cross units have had to attend road traffic accidents involving horses injured on the public road, either in collision with vehicles or from incidents involving horseboxes or trailers.

External links
 The Irish Blue Cross' Website

Charities based in the Republic of Ireland
Animal welfare organisations based in the Republic of Ireland